Thorntons LLC, formerly Thorntons Inc., is a gasoline and convenience store chain headquartered in Louisville, KY.  Thorntons LLC currently operates 200+ locations which vary from traditional fuel and convenience stores, stores with expanded kitchen formats and Travel Centers.  Thorntons stores are located in six states: Florida, Illinois, Indiana, Kentucky, Ohio, and Tennessee.  It was founded in 1971 by James H. Thornton.

History
The first Thorntons location opened in 1971 in Clarksville, Indiana. The original site featured a kiosk building and a full-service attendant. In the 1980s, Thorntons transitioned from kiosk locations to convenience stores and grew to over 100 locations.

In 2013, Thorntons introduced a larger store model with an expanded food program in select Louisville, Kentucky and Southern Indiana stores. In 2016, this platform was expanded in select Chicago metropolitan area stores.

Around the same time frame, Thorntons rolled out Unleaded15 fuel which provides an octane rating of 88 and contains approximately 15% ethanol. Certain Thorntons locations also offer E85, a gasoline-ethanol blend containing up to 85% ethanol.

In 2019, Thorntons was acquired by a joint venture between Arclight Capital Partners and BP.  The acquisition was made final on February 11, 2019.  Simon Richards, former Head of Regional Development of BP Products North America, currently serves as the CEO of Thorntons LLC. On July 13, 2021, BP announced they will acquire ArcLight Capital Partners' share of Thorntons, and thus fully own the convenience store company. The deal is expected to close later in the year. BP plans to retain the Thorntons brand, which would make it a sister chain to BP-owned ampm; the two chains do not overlap.

References

External links
 

BP
Companies based in Louisville, Kentucky
Gas stations in the United States
Convenience stores of the United States
American companies established in 1971
Retail companies established in 1971
2019 mergers and acquisitions
1971 establishments in Indiana